The British Kaffrarian Government Gazette was the government gazette of British Kaffraria. It was published in the 1860s during the brief period for which British Kaffraria was a Crown Colony (1860–1866).

See also
List of British colonial gazettes

References

British colonial gazettes
1860s disestablishments
Cape Colony
Publications established in the 1860s